The Marquesas Islands were the first of the island groups discovered by European explorers in the Pacific.  Over the centuries, these Polynesian islands have been variously known by a number of names.

The islands are known in Marquesan variously as Te Henua Kenana or Te Henua Enana in North Marquesan and Te Fenua Enata in South Marquesan.

The first recorded European visitor to the islands was the Spanish navigator and explorer Álvaro de Mendaña de Neira who came upon them by chance in 1595. He named them "Las Islas Marquesas de Mendoza" in honor of the wife of his patron García Hurtado de Mendoza, 5th Marquis of Cañete, the Viceroy of Perú.

The islands are divided into two groups: a southern group of five islands and a northern group consisting of Ua Pou, Ua Huka and Nuku Hiva along with a set of smaller islands to the northwest. The southern and northern Marquesas have distinct forms of Marquesan geography, Marquesan language, and Marquesan culture.

While there is no native Marquesan name to differentiate between the northern and southern groups, they have been differentiated as such, at least by American navigators, historically, by the names "Washington Islands" to refer to the northern Marquesas, and "Mendaña Islands" to refer to the southern Marquesas.

Following is a list of the islands, giving first their most widely accepted Marquesan names, followed by variants:

Eiao
Fremantle
Knox
Masse
Robert
Hiaou
Iau
Hatutu
Hatutaa
Hatoutou
Chanal
Hancock
Langdon
Motu One
Sable
Îlot de Sable
Lincoln
Motu Iti
Hatu Iti
Nuku Hiva
Nukuhiva
Nukahiva
Federal Island (named by Joseph Ingraham)
Adams (named by Josiah Roberts)
Beaux (named by Étienne Marchand)
Sir Henry Martin (named by )
Madison (named by David Porter)
Ua Huka (including Motu Papa and Epiti)
Uahuka
Huahuna
Riou
Roahonga
Solide
Ua Pou (including Motu Mohoke and Motu Oa)
Ua Pou
Uapou
Uapu
Huapu
Adams
Marchand
Fatu Uku
Fatuhuku
Fatuuku
Fatou Houkou
Hood's Island
Hiva Oa (including Hanakee)
Hivaoa
Hiva Hoa
Hiavaoa
Dominica
Tahuata
Taahuata
Tuhuata
Santa Christina
Moho Tani
Motane
Mohotane
San Pedro
Fatu Hiva
Fatu Iva
Fatouhiva
Magdalena
Motu Nao
Thomasset Rock
Rocher Thomasset
Ariane Rock

References